Bahía de los Ángeles Airport  is a paved airstrip located 2 miles North of Bahía de los Ángeles, Baja California, Mexico. It handles general aviation service for the town of Bahía de los Ángeles.  There is a permanent military guard for the security of the facilities and the aircraft, although two aircraft were reported stolen from the airport, both in 2009.

See also 
 Bahía de los Ángeles
 Baja California

References

External links
 Info about Bahía de los Ángeles and its airstrip
 Photo of Bahía de los Ángeles airstrip
 BHL at World Airport Codes
 BHL at Flightstats
 

Airports in Baja California